"The Long Morrow" is episode 135 of the American television anthology series The Twilight Zone. It originally aired on January 10, 1964 on CBS. In this episode, an astronaut falls in love on the eve of a 40-year-long space voyage. The story focuses on how he and his lover confront the problem that his 40 years in suspended animation will cause a wide age disparity between them by the time he returns.

Opening narration
Serling's narration begins with the opening scene of Stansfield in suspended animation:

The narration continues after Stansfield is informed that his journey into space will take forty years:

Plot
Commander Douglas Stansfield, age 31, an astronaut in the year 1987, is scheduled in six months to be sent on an exploratory mission to a planetary system roughly 141 light-years from Earth. Although the spacecraft will travel at the rate of 7 times the speed of light, the round trip will still take forty years. To save him the ordeal of 40 years of loneliness, he is to be placed in (newly developed) suspended animation for the twenty-year trip to his goal, and again for the twenty-year return trip.  During his time in suspended animation, he will age only a few weeks.

Shortly before his mission, he meets and is enchanted by his young colleague, Sandra Horn. They meet that night, after only three and half hours, they declare their love for each other, and lament the fact that when Stansfield returns, Sandra will be an old woman.

Forty years later, Stansfield returns to Earth, a forgotten pioneer. The discoveries he made on his mission were independently achieved earlier by technology developed after his departure. Sandra is waiting for him, still 26 and lovely. She had herself put in suspended animation during Stansfield's mission. Stansfield, however, had voluntarily disabled his suspended-animation system six months into his journey after a communications failure on his ship, and is now a man of 70. He has endured forty years of inconceivable loneliness in the hope of being with Sandra when he returned. Sandra offers to continue their relationship, but the heartbroken Stansfield urges Sandra to begin a new life without him.

After Sandra leaves, General Walters offers some small consolation to the aged astronaut: "Stansfield, you're really quite an incredible man. It may be the one distinction of my entire life, that I knew you ... that I knew a man who put such a premium on love."

Closing narration

Cast

Robert Lansing as Commander Douglas Stansfield
Mariette Hartley as Sandra Horn
George Macready as Dr. Bixler
Ed Binns as General Walters 
William Swan as Technician
Don Spruance

Legacy
"The Long Morrow" is the title of a Season 7 episode of Gilmore Girls, where Logan gives Rory a gift inspired by his favorite The Twilight Zone episode, "The Long Morrow".

References
DeVoe, Bill. (2008). Trivia from The Twilight Zone. Albany, GA: Bear Manor Media. 
Grams, Martin. (2008). The Twilight Zone: Unlocking the Door to a Television Classic. Churchville, MD: OTR Publishing.

External links

1964 American television episodes
The Twilight Zone (1959 TV series season 5) episodes
Cryonics in fiction
Fiction set in 1987
Fiction set in 1988
Fiction set in 2027
Television episodes written by Rod Serling
Works about astronauts